Edwin Mena (born 23 August 1958) is an Ecuadorian former cyclist. He competed in the team pursuit event at the 1980 Summer Olympics.

References

External links
 

1958 births
Living people
Ecuadorian male cyclists
Olympic cyclists of Ecuador
Cyclists at the 1980 Summer Olympics
Place of birth missing (living people)